The Wongkadjera were an indigenous people of the state of Queensland.

Country
Their northern limits were close to Roxborough.

Social organization
The Wongkadjera were divided into hordes, the name of one of which probably survives.
 ? Nambila-nambila.

Economy
The Glenormiston area around the Mulligan River was a key producer of the narcotic pituri, and archaeological evidence has emerged suggesting that the Furthermore, it is postulated that the Wongkadjera, together with other local tribes, such as the Rungarungawa and Julaolinja, used it and stone axes from the Kalkatungu mines in the Mt. Isa district as trade goods, exchanging them in order to secure access to the Channel Country along the Georgina and Diamantina Rivers.

Alternative names
 Wonkajara
 Wonkatyeri
 Wonkoyara

Source:

Notes

Citations

Sources

Aboriginal peoples of Queensland